Badopal is a large village in Fatehabad tehsil of Fatehabad district of Haryana state in North India.

Demographics
According to 2011 Census of India, it has population of 8833, including 4635 males and 4198 females, with 68.37% literacy rate compared to Haryana state average of 75.55%, and 16.43% Schedule Caste (SC) and no Scheduled Tribes (ST).

Wildlife

Badopal has nearly 500 deer, blackbucks, bluebucks (nilgai in Hindi), and other wild animals who are protected and cared for by the resident Bishnoi people of the Badopal village. 

Eventually after the intervention of wildlife activists, Bishnoi community and the courts, the plan for township near Badopal was abandoned and site of building township relocated to Agroha and the site for building township near Badopal became available for the sustainment of wildlife.

Bishnoi community have created a group to look after the wildlife in this area. They got the barbed wire banned in the area, regularly deweed the site for allowing fodder for wildlife to grow, got rid off the threat of human poachers and stray dogs who attack and kill the wildlife, and have applied to National Green Tribunal Act to have the site declared a protected wildlife area. Consequently, due to the protection measures by the community, the number of deer and other wildlife has increased in the area.

Issues
Soil salinity, due to water logging, is making the farm land infertile causing economic difficulties for the farmers of the area.

See also 
 Agroha Mound, ancient archaeological site nearby
 Forests Department, Haryana
 Rakhigarhi, ancient archaeological site nearby
 List of Monuments of National Importance in Haryana
 Wildlife sanctuaries and national parks of Haryana
 List of State Protected Monuments in Haryana

References 

Villages in Fatehabad district